The Samseong Museum of Publishing is a museum in Seoul, South Korea; it is a private museum related to printing and publishing. Located in Gugi-dong, Jongno-gu, visitors can see all manner of artifacts and historical items at the museum. It was founded in 1990 by Kim Jonggyu of the Samsung Publishing Company.

See also
List of museums in South Korea

References

Museums in Seoul
Media museums